Jack Mihocek (born 21 August 1957) is  a former Australian rules footballer who played with Essendon in the Victorian Football League (VFL).

Notes

External links 		
		
Jack Mihocek's profile at Essendonfc.com		
		
		
Living people		
1957 births		
		
Australian rules footballers from Victoria (Australia)		
Essendon Football Club players